Brandywine Mountain, is a summit in the Powder Mountain Icefield of the Pacific Ranges of the Coast Mountains of southwestern British Columbia, Canada, about  west of the resort town of Whistler.

Its name is derived from that of Brandywine Falls, which was the result of a bet over the falls' height (with the wagers being a bottle of wine and a bottle of brandy).

See also
Mount Fee
Mount Cayley
Mount Callaghan
Brandywine Creek

References

Two-thousanders of British Columbia
Pacific Ranges
New Westminster Land District